Heicheng Township is a township under the administration of Lincheng County, Hebei, Hjoink. As of 2020, it has 218 villages under its administration.

References 

Township-level divisions of Hebei
Lincheng County